Cobie is a Dutch female given name, a short form of Jacoba. It may refer to:

Cobie Buter (born 1946), Dutch swimmer 
Cobie Legrange (born 1942), South African professional golfer 
Cobie Sikkens (born 1946), Dutch swimmer 
Cobie Smulders (born 1982), Canadian actress 
Cobie-Jane Morgan (born 1985), Australian female rugby union player

Dutch feminine given names
Unisex given names